Rylstone railway station was a railway station that served the small village of Rylstone in North Yorkshire, England. It was built by the Yorkshire Dales Railway and operated by the Midland Railway. The station opened on 29 July 1902 with a station building that was to the same design as most of the stations on the Derwent Valley Light Railway.

The station had just one platform with a through line, with a goods shed and cattle dock to the east side, and a passing loop to the north of the station.

The LMS closed the station to passengers in 1930, but special 'tourist trains' ran to Grassington & Threshfield via Rylstone up until 11 August 1969. Rylstone station has been demolished, but the line is still open to Swinden Quarry.

References

Sources

Disused railway stations in North Yorkshire
Railway stations in Great Britain opened in 1902
Railway stations in Great Britain closed in 1930
Former Midland Railway stations